Justice Richardson may refer to:

 Frank K. Richardson (1914-1999), associate justice of the Supreme Court of California
 John Crowley Richardson, associate justice of the Supreme Court of Missouri
 Robert A. Richardson (died 1895), associate justice of the Virginia Supreme Court of Appeals
 William M. Richardson, chief justice of the New Hampshire Supreme Court.
 Thomas Richardson (judge) (1569–1635), chief justice of the Common Pleas and chief justice of the King's Bench
 William S. Richardson (1919–2010), chief justice of the Hawaiʻi State Supreme Court

See also
Judge Richardson (disambiguation)